The 2016 TCU Horned Frogs baseball team represented Texas Christian University during the 2016 NCAA Division I baseball season. The Horned Frogs played their home games at Charlie & Marie Lupton Baseball Stadium as a member of the Big 12 Conference. They were led by head coach Jim Schlossnagle, the winningest coach in TCU baseball history, in his 13th year at TCU.

Previous season
The 2015 TCU Horned Frogs baseball team notched a 51–15 (18–5) regular season record and were the regular season Big 12 Conference champions. For the second consecutive year, the Horned Frogs were selected as the #7 national seed in the NCAA tournament, and the Frogs were selected to host an NCAA Regional against NC State, Stony Brook and Sacred Heart at their home park. In the decisive Fort Worth Regional championship game, TCU trailed NC State in an 8–1 ballgame entering the bottom of the 8th inning. TCU plated 6 unearned runs in the bottom of the 8th, tied the game in the bottom of the 9th, and clinched the game with a walk-off run in the bottom of the 10th to win the Regional championship and advance to host the Fort Worth Super Regional over Texas A&M. TCU won the Fort Worth Super Regional over the Aggies with a walk-off run in the bottom of the 16th inning of the decisive game 3, earning the Frogs a trip to the 2015 College World Series. At the College World Series, TCU reached the national semifinal and notched a 2–2 record with two wins over LSU and two losses to Vanderbilt. TCU finished the season ranked #4.

Preseason

2015 MLB Draft
Eight Horned Frogs from the 2015 roster were drafted in the 2015 MLB draft. Redshirt Junior RHP Mitchell Traver was selected by the St. Louis Cardinals in the 28th round and elected to return to TCU for the 2016 season. The following 7 drafted players departed the program for Major League Baseball after TCU's College World Series appearance:

Departed Players
In addition to the 7 players that departed after being drafted in the 2015 MLB Draft, 4 seniors graduated and 5 other players departed the program:

Recruits & Transfers
The Horned Frogs' 2015 recruiting and transfer class was led by 2015 Gatorade National Player of the Year, Luken Baker. The 18 new players for 2016 include the following 13 freshmen and 5 junior transfers:

Season Projections
Coming off back-to-back College World Series appearances in 2014 and 2015, TCU entered the 2016 season ranked as high as #11 in preseason polls.  The Horned Frogs were voted as the favorite to win the regular season Big 12 title in the preseason Big 12 coaches' poll.  College baseball writers for D1 Baseball, Baseball America, and Perfect Game all selected the Frogs to finish second in the Big 12, behind Oklahoma State.

In-depth preseason TCU previews were compiled by and are available from: D1 Baseball (podcast), Baseball America and Perfect Game.

In-depth preseason Big 12 previews were compiled by and are available from: D1 Baseball, Baseball America and Perfect Game.

Prior to the start of the season, D1 Baseball projected the Frogs as one of the 16 NCAA Tournament Regional hosts. Baseball America projected TCU as a 2-seed in a Houston Regional, and two of their four writers projected TCU freshman Luken Baker would be named Freshman of the Year.

Personnel

Roster

Injury report

Coaching staff
TCU returns its entire coaching staff from the Frogs' 2014 and 2015 College World Series seasons. The Frogs also added former TCU standout Josh Elander as a student assistant coach. Elander played as a freshman on TCU's 2010 College World Series team, was drafted in the sixth round of the 2012 draft, and spent four years in the minor leagues before returning to TCU in August 2015.

Schlossnagle Milestones
On February 21, 2016, TCU Head Coach Jim Schlossnagle became the winningest coach in TCU baseball history with his 518th win; Schlossngale passed former TCU letterman and head coach Lance Brown to become the Frogs' all-time winningest coach.

Regular season
In time for the start of the 2016 regular season, TCU debuted the latest in its baseball facilities additions with the opening of the new $8 million left field line complex at Charlie & Marie Lupton Baseball Stadium, which houses the TCU home locker room, team classroom, team lounge, sports medicine center, equipment room, and coaches' offices (photo gallery). The 2016 season will also debut the addition of a new video board in left field and an expanded right field berm for general admission patrons. The new left field line facility and video board are in addition to the $2.5 million indoor hitting/pitching facility and turf practice area that opened immediately prior to the 2015 regular season.

Prior to Opening Day, the Horned Frogs kicked off the 2016 season with the annual First Pitch Banquet on February 12, hosted by two former TCU players: Jake Arrieta, a starting pitcher for the Chicago Cubs and the 2015 National League Cy Young Award winner, and Matt Carpenter, the starting third baseman for the St. Louis Cardinals and a two-time MLB All-Star. The varsity Horned Frogs hosted over 60 TCU baseball alumni for the annual Alumni Game on February 13; at least 15 current professional baseball players took the field for the alumni team.

The team's theme for the 2016 season, portrayed in the program's annual introductory video, is "Uncommon."

February
The Horned Frogs opened the 2016 season at home versus Loyola Marymount on February 19, 2016. The Frogs' Friday night ace pitcher missed the early weeks of the season after a muscle strain injury on February 12. Senior starting center fielder and leadoff hitter Nolan Brown was also out of the lineup in the opening weeks after undergoing surgery for a hamate bone injury in January. The Frogs won their opening series against Loyola Marymount two games to one, and Jim Schlossnagle became the all-time winningest coach in TCU baseball history in the series finale on February 21, 2016. TCU competed at the Shrines Hospitals for Children College Classic at Minute Maid Park in Houston, from February 26 through February 28; the Frogs knocked off three ranked teams (Louisiana–Lafayette, Rice and Houston) to extend their winning streak to 6 games at the close of the month of February. The Frogs were named Tournament Champions, and three Frogs earned four All-Tournament Team honors.

March
TCU entered the month of March with a 6–1 record, ranked as high as #7 in national polls. The Frogs opened the month by run-ruling UTRGV 13–0 in just 7 innings; the lopsided shutout marked the Frogs' second run-rule win of the year and extended their win streak to 7 games. After seeing their winning streak snapped in the series opener versus Gonzaga in a 5–4 loss, TCU rebounded to blast Gonzaga 10–2 and 16–1; the Frogs notched 13 extra-base hits in their two wins over Gonzaga, Big 12 leading hitter Elliott Barzilli raised his season batting average to .512, and in the Sunday series finale, all nine batters in the initial lineup had at least one hit.

April

May

Postseason

Big 12 tournament
For the second time in three years, the Horned Frogs won the Big 12 Conference's automatic berth to the NCAA tournament by winning the Big 12 Conference Tournament at Bricktown Ballpark in Oklahoma City, OK.  At the conclusion of the Big 12 Tournament, the Frogs had won 9 of their last 10 games.

Fort Worth Regional
For the sixth time in eight years, TCU was selected as one of sixteen NCAA Tournament Regional hosts.  The Horned Frogs drew two-seed Arizona State, three-seed Gonzaga, and four-seed Oral Roberts.  The winner of the Fort Worth Regional will face the winner of the college Station Regional, setting up a potential 2015 Super Regional rematch between TCU and Texas A&M.

The Horned Frogs opened the 2016 NCAA Tournament with a 7–0 win over Oral Roberts.

College Station Super Regional
The Horned Frogs faced the Aggies in an NCAA Super Regional for the second consecutive year. The Horned Frogs captured game one of the series in College Station with a dominant 8–2 victory, lost game two, and won game three to advance to the College World Series.

College World Series
TCU advanced to the College World Series for the third consecutive year and will face Texas Tech in game one, a rematch of their opening game in the 2014 College World Series.

Schedule and results
TCU announced its 2016 schedule on October 5, 2015. TCU's original 55-game slate expected the Horned Frogs to play 30 home games, 22 road games, and 3 neutral site contests. The schedule was highlighted by 15 games against 2015 postseason participants. The official schedule and game/player statistics are available at GoFrogs.com.

! style="background:#4d1979;color:white;"| Regular Season
|- valign="top" 

|- bgcolor="#ffbbbb"
| February 19 || 6:30 pm || || * || #15 || Lupton Stadium • Fort Worth, TX || L3–5 || Redman(1–0) || Janczak(0–1) || – || 5,116 || 0–1 || – || StatsStory 
|- bgcolor="#bbffbb"
| February 20 || 2:00 pm || || Loyola Marymount* || #15 || Lupton Stadium • Fort Worth, TX || W1–0 || Howard(1–0) || Abbott(0–1) || Trieglaff(1) || 4,509 || 1–1 || – || StatsStory 
|- bgcolor="#bbffbb"
| February 21 || 11:30 am || || Loyola Marymount* || #15 || Lupton Stadium • Fort Worth, TX || W5–0 || Baker(1–0) || Cohen(0–1) || – || 3,687 || 2 –1 || – || StatsStory 
|- bgcolor="#bbffbb"
| February 24 || 6:30 pm || || * || #15 || Lupton Stadium • Fort Worth, TX || W17–3 || Roedahl(1–0) || Estep(0–2) || – || 3,573 || 3–1 || – || StatsStory
|- bgcolor="#bbffbb"
| February 26 || 4:05 pm || MLBN/RSSW || #6 Louisiana–Lafayette* || #15 || Minute Maid Park • Houston, TX (Shriners Hospitals for Children College Classic) || W7–1 || Howard(2–0) || Leger(0–1) || – || 5,335 || 4–1 || – || StatsStory
|- bgcolor="#bbffbb"
| February 27 || 8:35 pm || MLBN/RSSW || #25 * || #15 || Minute Maid Park • Houston, TX (Shriners Hospitals for Children College Classic) || W10–07 || Baker(2–0) || Salinas(0–1) || – || 7,881 || 5–1 || – || StatsStory
|- bgcolor="#bbffbb"
| February 28 || 4:05 pm || MLBN/RSSW || #16 * || #15 || Minute Maid Park • Houston, TX (Shriners Hospitals for Children College Classic) || W10–1 || Janczak(1–1) || Ullcom(1–1) || – || 6,516 || 6–1 || – || StatsStory
|-

|- bgcolor="#bbffbb"
| March 1 || 6:30 pm || FCS || * || #9 || Lupton Stadium • Fort Worth, TX || W13–07 || Horton(1–0) || Kufrovich(0–1) || – || 3,566 || 7–1 || – || StatsStory
|- bgcolor="#ffbbbb"
| March 4 || 6:30 pm || FSSW+ || * || #9 || Lupton Stadium • Fort Worth, TX || L3–4 || Bailey(2–0) || Guillory(0–1) || Bies(1) || 3,801 || 7–2 || – || StatsStory
|- bgcolor="#bbffbb"
| March 5 || 2:00 pm || || Gonzaga* || #9 || Lupton Stadium • Fort Worth, TX || W10–2 || Howard(3–0) || Vernia(0–2) || – || 3,875 || 8–2 || – || StatsStory
|- bgcolor="#bbffbb"
| March 6 || 1:00 pm || || Gonzaga* || #9 || Lupton Stadium • Fort Worth, TX || W16–1 || Hill(1–0) || Morgan(1–1) || – || 3,723 || 9–2 || – || StatsStory
|- bgcolor="#bbffbb"
| March 8 || 5:30 pm || || * || #11 || Lupton Stadium • Fort Worth, TX || W5–1 || Horton(2–0) || Schneider(0–1) || – || 3,895 || 10–2 || – || StatsStory
|- bgcolor="#bbffbb"
| March 11 || 6:30 pm || || * || #11 || Lupton Stadium • Fort Worth, TX || W8–3 || Janczak(2–1) || Davis(2–2) || – || 3,597 || 11–2 || – || StatsStory
|- bgcolor="#bbffbb"
| March 12 || 2:00 pm || || USC* || #11 || Lupton Stadium • Fort Worth, TX || W12–1110 || Trieglaff(1–0) || Kriske(0–1) || – || 4,209 || 12–2 || – || StatsStory
|- bgcolor="#ffbbbb"
| March 13 || 1:00 pm || FSSW || USC* || #11 || Lupton Stadium • Fort Worth, TX || L6–16 || Wegman(1–0) || Hill(1–1) || – || 4,765 || 12–3 || – || StatsStory
|- bgcolor="#bbffbb"
| March 15 || 6:30 pm || || at Rice* || #11 || Reckling Park • Houston, TX || W6–4 || Trieglaff(2–0) || Myers(1–1) || – || 3,406 || 13–3 || – || StatsStory
|- bgcolor="#bbffbb"
| March 18 || 6:30 pm || || West Virginia || #11 || Lupton Stadium • Fort Worth, TX || W10–6 || Wymer(1–0) || Grove(0–2) || – || 4,379 || 14–3 || 1–0 || StatsStory
|- bgcolor="#bbffbb"
| March 19 || 3:00 pm || || West Virginia || #11 || Lupton Stadium • Fort Worth, TX || W7–1 || Howard(4–0) || Vance(3–1) || – || 4,364 || 15–3 || 2–0 || StatsStory
|- bgcolor="#bbffbb"
| March 20 || 1:00 pm || || West Virginia || #11 || Lupton Stadium • Fort Worth, TX || W14–27 || Hill(2–1) || Myers(2–2) || – || 4,190 || 16–3 || 3–0 || StatsStory
|- bgcolor="#bbffbb"
| March 22 || 6:30 pm || FSSW+ || * || #9 || Lupton Stadium • Fort Worth, TX || W6–4 || Horton(3–0) || Cole(1–3) || Feltman(1) || 4,038 || 17–3 || – || StatsStory
|- bgcolor="#ffbbbb"
| March 24 || 6:00 pm || LHN || at Texas || #9 || UFCU Disch–Falk Field • Austin, TX || L3–4 || Duke(2–1) || Baker(2–1) || Mayes(1) || 4,828 || 17–4 || 3–1 || StatsStory
|- bgcolor="#ffbbbb"
| March 25 || 6:00 pm || LHN || at Texas || #9 || UFCU Disch–Falk Field • Austin, TX || L0–2 || Culbreth(4–2) || Howard(4–1) || Mayes(2) || 4,004 || 17–5 || 3–2 || StatsStory
|- bgcolor="#bbffbb"
| March 26 || 2:30 pm || FS1 || at Texas || #9 || UFCU Disch–Falk Field • Austin, TX || W9–5 || Burnett(1–0) || Kingham(1–2) || – || 7,093 || 18–5 || 4–2 || StatsStory
|- bgcolor="#bbffbb"
| March 29 || 6:30 pm || || at Texas–Arlington* || #15 || Clay Gould Ballpark • Arlington, TX || W17–4 || Janczak(3–1) || Vassar(1–1) || – || 1,196 || 19–5 || – || StatsStory
|-

|- bgcolor="#bbffbb"
| April 1 || 6:30 pm || ESPN3 || at * || #15 || Eck Stadium • Wichita, KS || W3–0 || Jancak(4–1) || Schwanke(4–3) || – || 2,105 || 20–5 || – || StatsStory
|- bgcolor="#bbffbb"
| April 2 || 1:00 pm || ESPNU || at Wichita State* || #15 || Eck Stadium • Wichita, KS || W17–6 || Trieglaff(3–0) || Hayes(0–3) || – || 2,995 || 21–5 || – || StatsStory
|- bgcolor="#bbffbb"
| April 3 || 1:00 pm || ESPN3 || at Wichita State* || #15 || Eck Stadium • Wichita, KS || W12–5 || Horton(4–0) || Lewis(0–5) || – || 2,554 || 22–5 || – || StatsStory
|- bgcolor="#ffbbbb"
| April 6 || 6:30 pm || FSSW+ || Texas–Arlington* || #10 || Lupton Stadium • Fort Worth, TX || L3–4 || Wilcox(2–2) || Hill(2–2) || Moreland(1) || 3,892 || 22–6 || – || StatsStory
|- bgcolor="#ffbbbb"
| April 8 || 6:00 pm || ESPN3 || at Kansas || #10 || Hoglund Ballpark • Lawrence, KS || L4–5 || Villines(3–1) || Janczak(4–2) || – || 1,317 || 22–7 || 4–3 || StatsStory
|- bgcolor="#bbffbb"
| April 9 || 6:00 pm || ESPN3 || at Kansas || #10 || Hoglund Ballpark • Lawrence, KS || W8–0 || Horton(5–0) || Weiman(1–3) || – || 1,237 || 23–7 || 5–3 || StatsStory
|- bgcolor="#bbffbb"
| April 10 || 1:00 pm || ESPN3 || at Kansas || #10 || Hoglund Ballpark • Lawrence, KS || W14–6 || Trieglaff(4–0) || Goldsberry(0–5) || – || 1,311 || 24–7 || 6–3 || StatsStory
|- bgcolor="#ffbbbb"
| April 12 || 6:30 pm || FSSW+ || * || #11 || Lupton Stadium • Fort Worth, TX || L(1–9) || Stutzman(4–1) || Burnett(1–1) || – || 3,851 || 24–8 || – || StatsStory
|- bgcolor="#bbffbb"
| April 15 || 7:00 pm || FS1 || Oklahoma || #11 || Lupton Stadium • Fort Worth, TX || W11–3 || Baker(3–1) || Madden(1–3) || Wymer(1) || 5,201 || 25–8 || 7–3 || StatsStory
|- bgcolor="#bbffbb"
| April 16 || 11:00 am || || Oklahoma || #11 || Lupton Stadium • Fort Worth, TX || W12–27 || Horton(6–0) || Andritsos(4–3) || – || 3,955 || 26–8 || 8–3 || StatsStory
|- bgcolor="#bbffbb"
| April 16 || 3:00 pm || FSSW+ || Oklahoma || #11 || Lupton Stadium • Fort Worth, TX || W2–0 || Howard(5–1) || Elliott(0–1) || Feltman(2) || 4,658 || 27–8 || 9–3 || StatsStory
|- bgcolor="#ffbbbb"
| April 22 || 6:00 pm || FCS || at Oklahoma State || #8 || Reynolds Stadium • Stillwater, OK || L0–9 ||  ||  ||  ||  || 27–9 || 9–4 || StatsStory
|- bgcolor="#bbffbb"
| April 23 || 3:00 pm || FSSW+ || at Oklahoma State || #8 || Reynolds Stadium • Stillwater, OK || W11–6 ||  ||  ||  ||  || 28–9 || 10–4 || StatsStory
|- bgcolor="#ffbbbb"
| April 24 || 1:00 pm || FCS || at Oklahoma State || #8 || Reynolds Stadium • Stillwater, OK || L7–11 ||  ||  ||  ||  || 28–10 || 10–5 || StatsStory
|- bgcolor="#bbffbb"
| April 26 || 6:00 pm || || at Dallas Baptist* ||  || Horner Ballpark • Dallas, TX || W2–07 ||  ||  ||  ||  || 29–10 || – || StatsStory
|- bgcolor="#ffbbbb"
| April 29 || 8:00 pm || FS1 || Texas Tech ||  || Lupton Stadium • Fort Worth, TX || L3–7 ||  ||  || ||  || 29–11 || 10–6 || 
|- bgcolor="#bbffbb"
| April 30 || 4:00 pm || FSSW+ || Texas Tech ||  || Lupton Stadium • Fort Worth, TX || W13–6 ||  ||  ||  ||  || 30–11 || 11–6 || 
|-

|- bgcolor="#ffbbbb"
| May 1 || 1:00 pm || || Texas Tech ||  || Lupton Stadium • Fort Worth, TX || L1–3 ||  ||  || || || 30–12 || 11–7 || 
|- bgcolor="#bbffbb"
| May 7 || 12:00 pm || || at * ||  || Lubrano Park • University Park, PA || W6–2 ||  ||  ||  ||  || 31–12 || – || 
|- bgcolor="#bbffbb"
| May 7 || 4:00 pm || || at Penn State* ||  || Lubrano Park • University Park, PA || W5–4 ||  ||  ||  ||  || 32–12 || – || 
|- bgcolor="#bbffbb"
| May 8 || 12:00 pm || || at Penn State* ||  || Lubrano Park • University Park, PA || W9–5 ||  ||  ||  ||  || 33–12 || – || 
|- bgcolor="#ffbbbb"
| May 13 || 6:35 pm || FSSW+ || at Baylor ||  || Baylor Ballpark • Waco, TX || L3–4 ||  ||  ||  ||  || 33–13 || 11–8 ||
|- bgcolor="#ffbbbb"
| May 14 || 3:05 pm || FSSW || at Baylor ||  || Baylor Ballpark • Waco, TX || L5–8 ||  ||  || || || 33–14 || 11–9 ||
|- bgcolor="#bbffbb"
| May 15 || 1:05 pm || FSSW+ || at Baylor ||  || Baylor Ballpark • Waco, TX || W7–3 ||  ||  || || || 34–14 || 12–9 ||
|- bgcolor="#bbffbb"
| May 17 || 6:30 pm || || * ||  || Lupton Stadium • Fort Worth, TX || W3–2 ||  ||  ||  ||  || 35–14 || – ||
|- bgcolor="#bbffbb"
| May 19 || 6:30 pm || || Kansas State ||  || Lupton Stadium • Fort Worth, TX || W3–2 ||  ||  ||  ||  || 36–14 || 13–9 ||
|- bgcolor="#bbffbb"
| May 20 || 6:30 pm || FSSW+ || Kansas State ||  || Lupton Stadium • Fort Worth, TX || W2–1 ||  ||  ||  ||  || 37–14 || 14–9 ||
|- bgcolor="#bbffbb"
| May 21 || 4:00 pm || FSSW || Kansas State ||  || Lupton Stadium • Fort Worth, TX || W9–3 ||  ||  ||  ||  || 38–14 || 15–9 ||
|-

|- 
! style="background:#4d1979;color:white;"| Postseason
|-

|- bgcolor="#bbffbb"
| May 25 || 3:05 pm || FCSFSSW+ || Baylor ||  || Bricktown Ballpark • Oklahoma City, OK || W12–5 ||  ||  ||  ||  || 39–14 || 1–0 ||
|- bgcolor="#bbffbb"
| May 26 || 8:15 pm || FCSFSSW+ || Oklahoma State ||  || Bricktown Ballpark • Oklahoma City, OK || W13–5 ||  ||  ||  ||  || 40–14 || 2–0 ||
|- bgcolor="#ffbbbb"
| May 27 || 12:30 pm || FCSFSSW+ || Texas ||  || Bricktown Ballpark • Oklahoma City, OK || L1–2 ||  ||  ||  ||  || 40–15 || 2–1 ||
|- bgcolor="#bbffbb"
| May 27 || 4:30 pm || FCSFSSW+ || Texas ||  || Bricktown Ballpark • Oklahoma City, OK || W8–2 ||  ||  ||  ||  || 41–15 || 3–1 ||
|- bgcolor="#bbffbb"
| May 28 || 1:00 pm || FSSW+ || West Virginia ||  || Bricktown Ballpark • Oklahoma City, OK (Big 12 Tournament Championship) || W11–1010 ||  ||  ||  ||  || 42–15 || 3–1 ||
|-

|- bgcolor="#bbffbb"
| June 3 || 7:45 pm || ESPNU ||  || #13 || Lupton Stadium • Fort Worth, TX || W7–0 || Traver(1–1) || Howe(6–5) || – || 4,150 || 43–15 || 1–0 || StatsStory
|- bgcolor="#bbffbb"
| June 4 || 6:30 pm || ESPN3 || Gonzaga || #13 || Lupton Stadium • Fort Worth, TX || W4–3 || Burnett(2–1) || Morgan(10–3) || Feltman(7) || 4,319 || 44–15 || 2–0 ||
|- bgcolor="#bbffbb"
| June 5 || 6:30 pm || ESPN3 || Arizona State || #13 || Lupton Stadium • Fort Worth, TX || W8–1 || Howard(8–2) || Erives(6–2) || – || 4,331 || 45–15 || 3–0 ||
|-

|- bgcolor="#bbffbb"
| June 10 || 8:00 pm || ESPN2 || at #1 Texas A&M || #10 || Olsen Field at Blue Bell Park • College Station, TX || W8–2 || Janczak(7–3) || Hill(9–2) || – || 6,109 || 46–15 || 4–0 || StatsStory
|- bgcolor="#ffbbbb"
| June 11 || 8:00 pm || ESPN || at #1 Texas A&M || #10 || Olsen Field at Blue Bell Park • College Station, TX || L1–7 || Simonds(11–3) || Traver(1–2) || – || 6,073 || 46–16 || 4–1 ||
|- bgcolor="#bbffbb"
| June 12 || 8:00 pm || ESPN2 || at #1 Texas A&M || #10 || Olsen Field at Blue Bell Park • College Station, TX || W4–1 || Howard(9–2) || Vinson(4–3) || Feltman(8) || 6,068 || 47–16 || 5–1 ||
|-

|- bgcolor="#bbffbb"
| June 19 || 2:00 pm || ESPNU || #4 Texas Tech || #3 || TD Ameritrade Park • Omaha, NE || W5–3 || Burnett(3–1) || Dugger(6–1) || Feltman(9) || 19,834 || 48–16 || 6–1 || 1–0 || StatsStory
|- bgcolor="#bbffbb"
| June 21 || 8:00 pm || ESPN || #5 Coastal Carolina || #3 || TD Ameritrade Park • Omaha, NE || W6–1 || Howard(10–2) || Cunningham(9–4) || Burnett(1) || 22,704 || 49–16 || 7–1 || 2–0 || StatsStory
|- bgcolor="#ffbbbb"
| June 24 || 7:00 pm || ESPN || #5 Coastal Carolina || #3 || TD Ameritrade Park • Omaha, NE || L1–4 || Beckwith(14–1) || Traver(1–3) || – || 24,904 || 49–17 || 7–2 || 2–1 || StatsStory
|- bgcolor="#ffbbbb"
| June 25 || 7:00 pm || ESPN || #5 Coastal Carolina || #3 || TD Ameritrade Park • Omaha, NE || L5–7 || Janczak || Cunningham || – ||  || 49–18 || 7–3 || 2–2 ||
|-

| style="font-size:88%" | Legend:       = Win       = Loss      Bold = TCU team member
|-
| style="font-size:88%" |  All rankings from Collegiate Baseball as-of the date of the contest.

Rankings

TCU began the season ranked #11 in the USA Today Coaches' Poll, #12 in the National Collegiate Baseball Writers Association poll, #15 in the Collegiate Baseball poll, #18 in the Baseball America ranking, #18 in the Perfect Game ranking, and #19 in the D1Baseball ranking.
TCU ended the season ranked #3 in all six polls.

Awards and honors

Preseason Awards

Weekly Awards

See also
2016 TCU Baseball Fact Book
2016 Big 12 Baseball Media Guide
2016 Big 12 Conference baseball tournament
2016 NCAA Division I baseball tournament
2016 NCAA Division I baseball season

References

TCU Horned Frogs
TCU Horned Frogs baseball seasons
TCU Horned Frogs baseball
TCU
College World Series seasons